John Christopher Fine of Scarsdale, New York is a marine biologist with a doctor of jurisprudence degree and has dived on shipwrecks all over the world. He is a Master Scuba Instructor and Instructor Trainer, and the author of over two dozen books on almost as many topics, including award-winning books dealing with ocean pollution. He has authored both fiction and non-fiction books.

The liaison officer of the United Nations Environment Programme and the Confédération Mondiale des Activités Subaquatiques, Fine is a fellow of the Explorers Club and a member of the Academy of Underwater Arts and Sciences, a recognition he received in honor of his numerous books in the field of juvenile education. He has been the recipient of international recognition for his pioneering work investigating toxic waste contamination of our land and water resources.

Bibliography 
 
 Lost on the Ocean Floor : Diving the World's Ghost Ships by John Christopher Fine (Annapolis, Md. : Naval Institute Press, ©2005)  OCLC 54966253
 Macmillan/McGraw-Hill Science by Macmillan Publishing Company (Macmillan/McGraw-Hill, ©1995) OCLC: 32987796
 Creatures of the Sea by John Christopher Fine (New York : Atheneum, 1989) ,  OCLC 19124941
 Sunken Ships & Treasure by John Christopher Fine (New York : Atheneum, 1986) ,  OCLC 13218514
 Oceans in Peril by John Christopher Fine (New York : Atheneum, 1987) ,  OCLC 14691973
 Making a Difference in the World by Lynne Cherry and John Christopher Fine (Katonah, N.Y. : Richard C. Owen, Publishers, ©2000) ,  [OCLC 43567591]
 Free Spirits in the Sky by John Christopher Fine (New York : Atheneum ; Toronto : Maxwell Macmillan Canada ; New York : Maxwell Macmillan International, 1994)  OCLC 27013735
 Seeing the Circle by Joseph Bruchac and John Christopher Fine (Katonah, N.Y. : R.C. Owen Publishers, ©1999) ,  [OCLC: 41049652]
 Diving for Treasure by John Christopher Fine (Katonah, NY : Richard C. Owens Publishers, 2000) , OCLC 49633222
 Exploring Underwater Photography by John Christopher Fine (Medford, NJ : Plexus Pub., ©1986) , OCLC 14239151
 Exploring the Sea: an Introduction to Marine Biology and Ocean Science by John Christopher Fine (Medford, NJ : Plexus Pub., 1982) , OCLC 9377730
 The Boy and the Dolphin fiction by John Christopher Fine and Alek Kardas (Mount Desert, Me. : Windswept House, ©1990) OCLC 22891584
 Diving with Sharks by John Christopher Fine (New York: F. Watts, 2000) , OCLC 41833964
 The Tested Man by John Christopher Fine (Mt. Desert, Me.: Windswept House Publishers, ©1994) , OCLC 32276178
 Dive to the Coral Reefs produced by Lancit Media Productions by Ruth Heller;  Paul P Sipiera and John Christopher Fine, VHS tape (Lincoln, NE : GNP, ©1985, 1994) OCLC: 30465159
 Dive to the Coral Reefs by Mark Mannucci;  LeVar Burton;  Elizabeth Taynton;  Lancit Media Productions.;  Great Plains National Instructional Television Library.;  WNED-TV (Television station : Buffalo, N.Y.) VHS tape (Lincoln, NE : GPN, ©1989) OCLC 42496212
 Sunken Ships and Treasure by John Christopher Fine (Macmillan, 1986) , OCLC: 32801622

References

Year of birth missing (living people)
Living people
21st-century American historians
American male non-fiction writers
American marine biologists
American underwater divers
People from Scarsdale, New York
Place of birth missing (living people)
Underwater archaeologists
Underwater photographers
Fellows of the Explorers Club
Historians from New York (state)
Scientists from New York (state)
21st-century American male writers